Morning's at Seven is a play by Paul Osborn. Its plot focuses on four aging sisters living in a small Midwestern town in 1928, and it deals with ramifications within the family when two of them begin to question their lives and decide to make some changes before it’s too late.

The original Broadway production, directed by Joshua Logan, opened on November 30, 1939, at the Longacre Theatre, where it ran for 44 performances. Director Logan chose to set it in 1938, which at the end of the Depression and the beginning of World War II seemed to make it less palatable to the audiences of that time. The cast included Dorothy Gish, Jean Adair, Enid Markey, and Kate McComb.

After 16 previews, the first Broadway revival, directed by Vivian Matalon, opened on April 10, 1980, at the Lyceum Theatre. The cast included Nancy Marchand, Maureen O'Sullivan, Elizabeth Wilson, Teresa Wright, Lois de Banzie, and David Rounds. This production, set back to its original 1920s period, was a great success, running for 564 performances and receiving numerous Tony Awards and Drama Desk Awards.

After 27 previews, the second Broadway revival, directed by Daniel Sullivan, opened on April 21, 2002, once again at the Lyceum, where it ran for 112 performances. The cast included Elizabeth Franz, Frances Sternhagen, Estelle Parsons, Piper Laurie, Julie Hagerty, Buck Henry, Christopher Lloyd, William Biff McGuire, and Stephen Tobolowsky. It was a popular and critical success and received numerous Tony Award and Drama Desk Award nominations.

Over the decades since it was written, the play has proven to be a popular choice for regional, community, and summer stock theatre productions; but it has never been made into a theatrical motion picture.

Television productions

The play has been performed on live television on several occasions. It was adapted by Robert Wallstens and performed on television as part of The Alcoa Hour 1956/57 season.  Air date was 4 November 1956.  The cast included Lillian Gish in the role of Esther Crampton and her sister Dorothy Gish in the role of Arry Gibbs.  June Lockhart, Dorothy Stickney, Evelyn Varden, and David Wayne were also in the cast.

In 1982 Vivian Matalon directed a television broadcast of the 1980 Broadway revival with Maureen O'Sullivan, Elizabeth Wilson, Teresa Wright, and Kate Reid replacing Nancy Marchand. The revival was first telecast on Showtime and later on PBS.

Awards and nominations

1980 Broadway revival

2002 Broadway revival

References

External links
1939 production credits
1980 production credits
2002 production credits
Internet Movie Database listing
Ben Brantley's New York Times review of the 2002 revival
1945 Theatre Guild on the Air radio adaptation at Internet Archive

1939 plays
American plays
Broadway plays
Tony Award-winning plays
Fiction set in 1938
Midwestern United States in fiction
Plays set in the United States